The National Bank of Samoa is a locally owned and private bank in Samoa.

History
Creation of the bank was proposed in March 1994 by Luamanuvae Dick Meredith, a successful Samoan businessman, matai and entrepreneur. In November of that year a banking license was sought and later granted on 27 February 1995. The bank officially opened its doors as the National Bank of Samoa Ltd on 11 December 1996.

The founding chairman was Muagututi’a George Meredith. He tendered his resignation in 1998 and Poumau Ena Edward Meredith was appointed Chairman from 1998–2002. Oloipola Terrence Betham was chairman until mid-2007, followed by Sili Epa Tuioti. The current chairman is Va’atuitui Apete Meredith.

Today the National Bank of Samoa is a thriving and successful bank offering a full range of retail services including savings, lending and international services to its customers. It is still 100% locally owned and has seen a significant period of growth.

In 2011 the Papua New Guinea-owned Bank South Pacific made a takeover offer to NBS shareholders.

In 2016 the bank celebrated its 20th anniversary.

References

External links

Official website

Banks established in 1996
Banks of Samoa
Economy of Samoa